St. Anthony Falls Bridge may refer to several bridges that cross the Mississippi River near St. Anthony Falls in Minneapolis:
Third Avenue Bridge (Minneapolis)
I-35W Mississippi River bridge, and its replacement, I-35W Saint Anthony Falls Bridge
The Stone Arch Bridge (Minneapolis) is between these, at the falls, but has not had that name.